Neha Hinge is an Indian model and actress. She was second runner up in Femina Miss India 2010 contest and represented India in Miss International 2010. She was among the Top 5 contestants in the Miss International 2010 competition.

Early life
Neha was born in Nashik and spent her formative years in Dewas, Madhya Pradesh. She did her schooling from St Mary's and BCM Higher Secondary School  in Dewas and later completed her Bachelor of Engineering from Dr. D.Y Patil Institute of Engineering and Technology, Pune. Neha, a qualified software engineer, quit her IT job to enter the Miss India pageant.

Femina Miss India
She was crowned Femina Miss India International in 2010. She also won subtitles, Miss Fresh Face, Miss Professional and Miss Bollywood Diva. She competed in Miss International 2010 and secured a spot among the top 5 contestants. She persuaded modelling later by being a part of major fashion weeks like Lakme fashion week, Blenders pride fashion tour, IIJW and many more. She has done more than 25 TV commercials for brands like Sunsilk, Pantaloons, Hero Cycles, Joyalukas, Malabar Gold, Kalyan silks to list a few.

Bollywood
She has been part of Bollywood films like Tiger Zinda Hai directed by Ali Abbas Zafar and produced by Yrf. Alongside Salman Khan, She played the role of Nurse Maria in the film who makes the call to the embassy informing them about the nurses being captured.

She made her Tollywood debut with Srivalli, where she played the lead role Srivalli. The film was directed by acclaimed writer
V. Vijayendra Prasad, who has written films like Bahubali, Eega, Magadheera and many more and also is father of director S S Rajamouli.

She is famous for her role as the prime time reporter Garima Deswal in Amazon Prime web series Tandav.

She also played Anand Tiwari's wife Malti Kumar in Zee5 film Nail Polish.

Filmography

References

External links

Female models from Madhya Pradesh
Indian beauty pageant winners
Living people
Actresses in Tamil cinema
1986 births
Actresses from Madhya Pradesh
Miss International 2010 delegates
Indian women engineers
People from Dewas
People from Dewas district
21st-century Indian actresses
Engineers from Madhya Pradesh
21st-century women engineers